Unicorn Peak is a peak, in Tuolumne Meadows, Yosemite National Park. Unicorn Peak is due east of Cathedral Peak, and the north summit is highest.

Unicorn Peak is part of the Cathedral Range.

All three of Unicorn Peak, Cockscomb Peak, and Cathedral Peak qualify as nunataks, islands that stood above the ice, when the last ice age created glaciers in the area. During the Tioga glaciation the peak projected above the glaciers, which carved and sharpened the peak's bases while plucking away at its sides.

On the area of Unicorn Peak

All of the following are at least close to Unicorn Peak:

 Budd Lake
 Cathedral Peak
 Cockscomb
 Echo Peaks
 Elizabeth Lake
 Johnson Peak

Hiking and rock climbing

Many hike, at least the base of Unicorn Peak, and to nearby sites.

References

External links and references

 One link on rock climbing Unicorn Peak, normal route
 Unicorn Peak, rock climbing
 Trails, Tuolumne: Elizabeth Lake & Unicorn Peak
 A YouTube, on Unicorn Peak
 A YouTube, 2 Days in Yosemite High Country: Unicorn Peak, Fly Fishing & North Dome
 A YouTube, Climbing the Unicorn Peak
 On the first ascent of Unicorn Peak
 An Ansel Adams photo of Unicorn Peak
 A topographic map of the region

Mountains of Yosemite National Park
Mountains of Northern California